Shelta Cave is a  cave and lake located in Huntsville, Madison County, Alabama, United States. It is described as one of the most bio-diverse caves within the Appalachian Mountains. The cave is currently owned and managed as a nature preserve by the National Speleological Society, with their main offices directly above the cave. It was declared a National Natural Landmark in October 1972.

History
This cave was an underground bar and dance hall in the early 1900s.

Speleology and wildlife
The cave is open to members of the NSS during certain times of the year to minimize the impact on the biome. There are now three sinkhole entrances. The lake can be as large as  during the winter and early spring rainy season.  Other times of the year, the lake bed is exposed.

There are nine species which were first discovered in this cave. The Shelta Cave crayfish is endemic to the cave.

Rediscovery 
In May 2022, biologists led by Dr. Matthew L. Niemiller reported the rediscovery of Orconectes sheltae at Shelta Cave for the first time since 1988. They announced that 20 cave crayfish were discovered during 12 of 20 surveys between October 2018 and July 2021. Two of them were identified as Orconectes sheltae. The study demonstrated that the species is not yet extinct as past authors had assumed.

References

External links
Shelta Cave Nature Preserve

Caves of Alabama
Geography of Huntsville, Alabama
National Natural Landmarks in Alabama
Protected areas of Madison County, Alabama
Nature reserves in Alabama
Landforms of Madison County, Alabama